Arawacus is a genus of butterflies in the family Lycaenidae. They are commonly called stripestreaks. The species of this genus are found in the Neotropical realm.

Species include:
 Arawacus aethesa (Hewitson, 1867) Brazil (Bahia)
 Arawacus aetolus (Sulzer, 1776) Columbia, Venezuela, Trinidad, Bolivia, Suriname 
 Arawacus binangula  (Schaus, 1902) Brazil (Paraná)
 Arawacus dolylas (Cramer, [1777]) Surinam, Venezuela, Colombia, Bolivia
 Arawacus dumenilii  (Godart, [1824]) Venezuela, Trinidad
 Arawacus ellida (Hewitson, 1867) Venezuela, Paraguay, Colombia, Peru, Argentina, Brazil (Rio de Janeiro)
 Arawacus euptychia  (Draudt, 1920 Brazil
 Arawacus hypocrita (Schaus, 1913) Costa Rica, Mexico
 Arawacus jada (Hewitson, 1867) North America – creamy stripe-streak, nightshade hairstreak
 Arawacus leucogyna (C. & R.Felder, 1865) Costa Rica, Panama, Venezuela, Colombia
 Arawacus lincoides (Draudt, 1917) Colombia
 Arawacus meliboeus (Fabricius, 1793) Brazil
 Arawacus separata  (Lathy, 1926) Peru, Paraguay
 Arawacus sito (Boisduval, 1836) Mexico, south to Central America – fine-lined stripe-streak
 Arawacus tadita (Hewitson, 1877) Brazil (Paraná)
 Arawacus tarania (Hewitson, 1868) Brazil (Paraná, Minas Gerais)
 Arawacus togarna (Hewitson, 1867) Mexico, Bolivia

External links

 
Eumaeini
Lycaenidae of South America
Lycaenidae genera
Taxonomy articles created by Polbot